List of hospitals in Calgary.

Alberta Children's Hospital (ACH)
East Calgary Health Centre (ECHC)
Foothills Medical Centre (FMC)
Peter Lougheed Centre (PLC)
Richmond Road Diagnostic & Treatment Centre (RRDTC)
Rockyview General Hospital (RGH)
Sheldon M. Chumir Health Centre (SMCHC)
South Calgary Health Centre (SCHC)
Southern Alberta Forensic Psychiatric Centre (SAFPC) 
South Health Campus (SHC)
Tom Baker Cancer Centre (TBCC)

See also
List of hospitals in Alberta